Joseph William Dunne (born 25 October 2001) is an English professional footballer who plays as a centre-back for Stafford Rangers.

Career
Dunne was born in Stafford.

Dunne made his debut for Rochdale on 12 November 2019, starting in a 2–1 away victory against Bradford City. In March 2020, Dunne joined Matlock Town on a work experience spell.

On 9 December 2021, Dunne joined Northern Premier League Premier Division side Stafford Rangers on a one-month loan deal. Dunne joined Stafford Rangers on a permanent basis in June 2022 following his release from Rochdale.

Career statistics

References

External links
 
 
 

Living people
2001 births
Sportspeople from Stafford
English footballers
Association football defenders
Rochdale A.F.C. players
Stafford Rangers F.C. players
Northern Premier League players